Philetor may refer to:

 Philetor (genus), a genus of vesper bats
 Erastes (Ancient Greece), an adult male in a relationship with an adolescent boy